Marczewski (feminine Marczewska) is a Polish surname. Notable people with the surname include:

 Edward Marczewski, Polish mathematician
 Frank-Michael Marczewski, German footballer
 Teresa Marczewska, Polish actress
 Wojciech Marczewski, Polish film director

Polish-language surnames